Hong Yong-ok (also Hong Yeong-ok, ; born August 19, 1986) is a North Korean weightlifter. Hong represented North Korea at the 2008 Summer Olympics in Beijing, where she competed for the women's light heavyweight category (69 kg). Hong, however, did not finish the event, after failing to lift a single-motion snatch of 103 kg in three attempts.

References

External links
NBC 2008 Olympics profile

North Korean female weightlifters
1986 births
Living people
Olympic weightlifters of North Korea
Weightlifters at the 2008 Summer Olympics